Shirley Banfield may refer to:

 Shirley Banfield (cricketer) (born 1937), Australian cricketer
 Shirley Banfield (criminal), tried for murdering her husband, Don Banfield, released on appeal. Conviction for fraud remained.